Gabriel Poulain was a French champion cyclist. He made several attempts to achieve human-powered flight and in July 1921 won a prize of 10,000 francs awarded by Peugeot for a flight of ten metres at a height of one metre, on a bicycle with two wing planes in the Bois de Boulogne in Paris.

References

French male cyclists
Year of birth missing
Year of death missing
People from Saint Helier
UCI Track Cycling World Champions (men)
French track cyclists